Mathews Brake National Wildlife Refuge encompasses  in west-central Mississippi. Established in 1980, the refuge is one of seven national wildlife refuges in the Theodore Roosevelt National Wildlife Refuge Complex. The primary habitat feature is Mathews Brake, the largest brake (natural wooded wetland area) in Leflore County. Each winter the brake provides habitat for over 30,000 ducks.

Neotropical migratory birds use the refuge during migration seasons throughout the year. The refuge supports about 200 species of migratory birds, including priority species such as the prothonotary warbler. This little cavity nester is a species of concern in other areas, but has plenty of habitat around the wooded waters of Mathews Brake.

Refuge staff manage the water level in the brake to promote moist-soil plants and to sustain oak trees around the edges for migratory birds. Hunting and fishing are the most popular programs on the refuge.

References
Refuge website

National Wildlife Refuges in Mississippi
Protected areas of Leflore County, Mississippi
Protected areas established in 1980
Wetlands of Mississippi
Landforms of Leflore County, Mississippi